Ryan Scott Bradley (born November 17, 1983) is an American former competitive figure skater. He is the 2008 Skate Canada International silver medalist, the 2009 Skate America bronze medalist, the 2011 U.S. national champion, and a three-time U.S. Collegiate champion.

Personal life 
Bradley was born in Saint Joseph, Missouri, and comes from a family of skaters. His sister, Becky, is a skating coach and former competitive skater, and his mother is a USFSA judge.

Bradley studied business at the University of Colorado at Colorado Springs. He is a volunteer at the Broadmoor Skating Club and a coach at the Colorado Springs World Arena.

Career 
Ryan Bradley began skating at the age of two and participated in the U.S. Figure Skating Basic Skills program from 1986-1988.

From 1996-1998, Bradley competed in pair skating with Tiffany Vise. They competed twice at the U.S. Championships. In 2001, he reached Sectionals with Melissa Gallegos. Bradley decided not to continue with pairs, preferring to focus on his singles career and not having enough time to train in both.

As a single skater, he won the silver medal on the Intermediate level at the Junior Olympics (later renamed Junior Nationals) in the 1994-1995 season. The 1995-1996 season was Bradley's first on the Novice level, and he did not make it out of Sectionals. In the 1996-1997 season, he placed 7th at the novice level at Nationals. In the 1997-1998 season, Bradley won the silver medal on the novice level at Nationals. This win earned him a trip to the Triglav Trophy, which he won.

The following season, 1998–1999, Bradley debuted on the ISU Junior Grand Prix. He won medals at both his events. At that time, the World Junior Championships were held before the U.S. Championships. At the Junior Worlds selection competition, Bradley placed second and was placed on the team for the 1999 Junior Worlds, where he placed 10th. At the 1999 U.S. Championships, he won the Junior title. He competed at the Gardena Spring Trophy following Nationals and won the competition.

In the 1999-2000 season, Bradley remained on the Junior Grand Prix circuit. He won two more medals and qualified for the Junior Grand Prix Final, where he finished 8th. He went on to place 7th in his senior debut at the 2000 U.S. Championships. He went on to place 5th at the 2000 Junior Worlds.

In the 2000-2001 season, Bradley won both of his Junior Grand Prix events and made his senior international debut at the Golden Spin of Zagreb, which he won. He placed 5th at the Junior Grand Prix Final. He placed 9th at the 2001 U.S. Championships. He was originally placed on the team for the 2001 Junior Worlds. However, he was forced to withdraw prior to the event with injury. He had surgery to repair damage to his landing knee. His vacated spot was given to Evan Lysacek.

In the 2001-2002 season, U.S. Figure Skating did not allow American skaters to compete on the Junior Grand Prix because of security concerns following the September 11, 2001 attacks. Bradley placed 7th at the 2002 U.S. Championships. He went on to the 2002 Junior Worlds and placed 15th.

In the 2002-2003 season, Bradley competed at the Karl Schafer Memorial, placing 4th. He made his Grand Prix debut at the 2003 Skate Canada International, where he placed 6th. He was 9th at the 2003 U.S. Championships.

In the 2003-2004 season, he placed 6th at the 2004 U.S. Championships. He made his senior ISU Championship debut at the 2004 Four Continents, where he placed 11th.

Bradley missed most of the 2004-2005 season after breaking his arm while playing dodge ball; he had a spiral fracture in the humerus of his right arm and was off the ice for six months.

He competed in the 2005-2006 season, hoping to contend for a spot to the 2006 Winter Olympics. He placed 8th at the 2006 U.S. Championships.

In the 2006-2007 season, Bradley was given a host invitation to the 2006 Skate America due to the retirement of skaters who had placed ahead of him at the 2006 Nationals. Bradley placed 8th.

Bradley accidentally cut his shin with his blade three weeks before the 2007 U.S. Championships. At the event, he held 3rd place after the short program. He skated last in the free skate, and won the silver medal, ahead of defending champion Johnny Weir. Upon learning that he had won the silver, Bradley skated back onto the ice and performed a backflip for the crowd. Bradley went on to the 2007 Four Continents, held at his home rink, the World Arena in Colorado Springs, Colorado, where he placed fourth behind training-mate Jeremy Abbott. During the off-season, he dealt with a torn meniscus in his right knee.

In the 2007-2008 season, Bradley competed on the Grand Prix circuit with a 6th place finish at Skate America and a 5th at Trophee Eric Bompard. He finished 5th at the 2008 U.S. Championships.

Bradley began the 2008-2009 season at the 2008 Skate Canada International, where he won the silver medal. He then placed 7th at 2008 Trophée Eric Bompard. At the 2009 U.S. Championships Bradley finished 4th. He was added to the U.S. team to the 2010 World Championships after Evan Lysacek withdrew. Before the event, Bradley broke the fifth metatarsal in his left foot but was cleared to compete. He finished 18th.

Bradley was initially planning to retire from competitive skating but decided to resume training in mid-October. He missed the Grand Prix season but competed at the 2011 U.S. Championships. Bradley won the short program and placed fourth in the free skate to win the overall competition and become the US National Champion for the first time in his career. He was selected to compete at the 2011 World Championships.

On May 10, 2011, Bradley announced his retirement from competitive skating. He was coached by Tom Zakrajsek for 22 years.

Commercials and endorsements 
Bradley appeared in a commercial for Fuji Xerox with Stéphane Lambiel, wearing heavy makeup to appear as an old man. He performed a backflip in this commercial. Due to its popularity, Fuji released a second one explaining how it was done.

Programs

Competitive highlights

Senior results as a singles skater

Pre-2002 results as a singles skater

Pairs career 
(with Tiffany Vise)

References

External links 

 
 

1983 births
Living people
Sportspeople from St. Joseph, Missouri
American male single skaters
University of Colorado alumni